Cynisca williamsi is a worm lizard species in the family Amphisbaenidae. It is endemic to Ghana.

References

Cynisca (lizard)
Reptiles described in 1987
Taxa named by Carl Gans
Endemic fauna of Ghana